An expatriation tax or emigration tax is a tax on persons who cease to be tax resident in a country. This often takes the form of a capital gains tax against unrealised gain attributable to the period in which the taxpayer was a tax resident of the country in question. In most cases, expatriation tax is assessed upon change of domicile or habitual residence; in the United States, which is one of only three countries (Eritrea and Myanmar are the others) to substantively tax its overseas citizens, the tax is applied upon relinquishment of American citizenship, on top of all taxes previously paid. Australia has "Deemed disposal tax" which in essence is exit tax.

Australia
"Deemed disposal" occurs when someone stops being an Australian resident. For tax purposes, they are deemed to have disposed of assets that are not taxable Australian property for their market value.

Canada
Canada imposes a "departure tax" on those who cease to be tax resident in Canada.  The departure tax is a tax on the capital gains which would have arisen if the emigrant had sold assets after leaving Canada ("deemed disposition"), subject to exceptions.  However, in Canada, unlike the U.S., the capital gain is generally based on the difference between the market value on the date of arrival in Canada (or later acquisition) and the market value on the date of departure.

Eritrea
Eritrea charges a 2% tax on income to all Eritreans who live outside Eritrea. This measure has been criticized by the Dutch government, which expelled a top Eritrean diplomat because of it.

Germany
In December 1931, the Reich Flight Tax was implemented as part of a larger emergency decree with the goal of stemming capital flight during the unstable Interbellum period. After the Nazis seized power in 1933, the Nazi government largely used the tax to confiscate assets from persecuted people (mostly Jews) who sought to flee Nazi Germany.

Today, in certain situations shares in corporations are treated as taxable income when permanently moving abroad.

Netherlands
The Netherlands has treaties with Belgium and Portugal permitting them to charge emigration tax against Dutch people who move to those countries. The aim is to impose a tax on persons who move abroad and cash out on the tax-free appreciation of their Dutch pensions. However, in 2009, the Supreme Court of the Netherlands ruled that the Tax and Customs Administration could not impose an emigration tax on a Dutch man who moved to France in 2001.

Norway
Norway imposes an emigration tax on unrealised capital gains as it appears on the day of departure if the unrealised gains exceeds 500,000 NOK. The tax may be deferred without collateral if the subject takes residence in another EEA member state, and with collateral otherwise. If the taxed gain is not realised within a five-year period, it will be assumed that the emigration was not motivated by tax purposes and the tax will be dismissed or refunded.

South Africa
The current South African exit tax regime works in concert with South Africa's foreign exchange controls. A person who is a resident of South Africa as defined under the exchange control laws (someone who is resident or domiciled in South Africa) may change status to become an emigrant, if the person is leaving the Common Monetary Area (South Africa, Namibia, Swaziland, and Lesotho) to take up permanent residence in another country. A single emigrant may expatriate up to R4 million of assets without exit charge, while a family is entitled to twice that amount. The emigrant must declare all worldwide assets to an Authorised Dealer of the South African Reserve Bank, and obtain a tax clearance certificate from the South African Revenue Service.

Spain
In December 2014, a new 'Exit Tax' was announced which is governed by Article 95 of the Income Tax Act. This applies to departing Spanish resident taxpayers with shares worth more than four million euros or one million if they hold a stake of 25% of a single business and then transfer their habitual residence outside Spain if they have previously lived in Spain 10 of the last 15 years.

United States 
Unlike all other countries with the exceptions of Eritrea and Hungary (with caveats), the United States taxes its citizens on worldwide income, even if they are permanently resident in another country. To deter tax avoidance by abandonment of citizenship, the United States imposes an expatriation tax on high net worth and high income individuals who give up U.S. citizenship. The tax also applies to lawful permanent residents or green-card holders who are considered "long-term residents." The Tax Code defines a long-term resident as any individual who is a lawful permanent resident of the United States in at least 8 taxable years during the period of 15 taxable years ending with the taxable year during which the expatriation occurs.

The first U.S. income tax to include U.S. citizens living overseas dates to 1862, but the first law to authorize taxation of former citizens was passed over a century later, in 1966. The 1966 law created Internal Revenue Code Section 877, which allowed the U.S.-source income of former citizens to be taxed for up to 10 years following the date of their loss of citizenship. Section 877 was first amended in 1996, at a time when the issue of renunciation of U.S. citizenship for tax purposes was receiving a great deal of public attention; the same attention resulted in the passage of the Reed Amendment, which attempted to prevent former U.S. citizens who renounced citizenship to avoid taxation from obtaining visas, but which was never enforced. The American Jobs Creation Act of 2004 amended Section 877 again. Under the new law, any individual who had a net worth of $2 million or an average income tax liability of $124,000 for the five previous years (adjusted annually for inflation) who renounces his or her citizenship is automatically assumed to have done so for tax avoidance reasons and is subject to additional taxes. Furthermore, with certain exceptions covered expatriates who spend at least 31 days in the United States in any year during the 10-year period following expatriation were subject to US taxation as if they were U.S. citizens or resident aliens.

A bill—which failed to advance to the Senate—entitled Tax Collection Responsibility Act of 2007 was introduced during the 110th session of congress in July 2007 by Charles B. Rangel. It contemplated, among others, a revision of the taxation of former American citizens whose citizenship officially ends. In particular, all property of an expatriate up to certain exceptions would be treated as having been sold on the day before the expatriation for its fair market value with any gain exceeding $600,000 classified as taxable income.

The HEART Act, passed on 17 June 2008, created the new Section 877A, which imposed a substantially different expatriation tax from that of the earlier Section 877. The new expatriation tax law, effective for calendar year 2009, defines "covered expatriates" as expatriates who have a net worth of $2 million, or a 5-year average income tax liability exceeding $139,000, to be adjusted for inflation, or who have not filed an IRS Form 8854 certifying they have complied with all federal tax obligations for the preceding 5 years. Notwithstanding the above, certain dual citizens by birth and certain minors as defined in Section 877A(g)(1)(B) are not considered "covered expatriates." Under the new expatriation tax law, "covered expatriates" are treated as if they had liquidated all of their assets on the date prior to their expatriation. Under this provision, the taxpayer's net gain is computed as if he or she had actually liquidated their assets. Net gain is the difference between the fair market value (theoretical selling price) and the taxpayer's cost basis (actual purchase price). Once net gain is calculated, any net gain greater than $600,000 will be taxed as income in that calendar year. The tax applies whether or not an actual sale is made by the taxpayer, and whether or not the notional gains arise on assets in the taxpayer's home country acquired before immigration to the United States. It is irrelevant that the gains may have partly arisen before the taxpayer moved to the U.S.

The new tax law also applies to deferred compensation (401(a), 403(b) plans, pension plans, stock options, etc.) of the expatriate. Traditional or regular IRAs are defined as specific tax deferred accounts rather than deferred compensation items. If the payer of the deferred compensation is a US citizen and the taxpayer expatriating has waived the right to a lower withholding rate, then the covered expatriate is charged a 30% withholding tax on their deferred compensation. If the covered expatriate does not meet the aforementioned criteria then the deferred compensation is taxed (as income) based on the present value of the deferred compensation.

In 2012, in the wake of Eduardo Saverin's renunciation of his citizenship, Sen. Chuck Schumer (D-NY) proposed the Ex-PATRIOT Act to levy additional taxes upon citizens renouncing their citizenship.

See also
Departure tax
Diploma tax
Double taxation

References

External links
 IRS Guide to Expatriation Tax
 Heroes Earnings Assistance and Relief Tax (HEART) Act of 2008 at govtrack.us
 US Domestic Options

Taxation in the United States
International taxation
Personal taxes